Emalahleni Local Municipality is located in the Nkangala District Municipality of Mpumalanga province, South Africa. eMalahleni is a Nguni name meaning place of coal.

Main places
The 2001 census divided the municipality into the following main places:

Politics 

The municipal council consists of sixty-eight members elected by mixed-member proportional representation. Thirty-four are elected by first-past-the-post voting in thirty-four wards, while the remaining thirty-four are chosen from party lists so that the total number of party representatives is proportional to the number of votes received. In the election of 1 November 2021 the African National Congress (ANC) won a majority of thirty-five seats on the council.

The following table shows the results of the election.

References

External links
Emalahleni Government site

Local municipalities of the Nkangala District Municipality